Mount Baldy ( White Mountain) is a mountain in eastern Arizona in the United States. The Mount Baldy Wilderness occupies the eastern slope of the mountain and is managed by the Apache-Sitgreaves National Forest.

The summit of Mount Baldy is within the Fort Apache Indian Reservation. It is the highest point in the White Mountains and Apache County. It is the fifth-highest point in the state, and the highest outside the San Francisco Peaks in the Flagstaff area. A third peak, Ord Peak, sits about three miles northwest of Baldy Peak, not to be confused with Mount Ord in Gila County.

Mount Baldy is one of the most sacred mountains to the Apache of Arizona. The Western Apache of Arizona inhabited the areas within their most four sacred mountain ranges: the White Mountains of Eastern Arizona, the Pinaleno Mountains near the town of Safford in southeastern Arizona, the Four Peaks near the City of Phoenix and the San Francisco Peaks near Flagstaff.

When Captain George M. Wheeler visited the mountaintop in 1873, he described the view as "The most magnificent and effective of any among the large number that have come under my observation".  Wheeler named the mountain Mount Thomas after General Lorenzo Thomas, who fought in the Mexican–American War.  It later became Mount Baldy. The name Mount Thomas has been assigned to a nearby peak by the U.S. Geological Survey.
 
Mount Baldy also contains the headwaters of the Little Colorado River and Salt River and produces the most abundant trout fishing streams in Arizona. No other mountain in Arizona produces as many rivers and streams. Along its slope are numerous man made lakes. The area around Mount Baldy also averages the most abundant precipitation in Arizona. Wildlife is abundant on the mountain and includes the recently introduced Mexican Grey Wolf.

While looking northeast from Historic Fort Apache (elevation ), Mount Baldy rises  in elevation.

Climate

See also

 List of mountains and hills of Arizona by height

References

White Mountains (Arizona)
Landforms of Apache County, Arizona
Mountains of Apache County, Arizona
White Mountain Apache Tribe